Bitche (German and Lorraine Franconian) is a commune in the Moselle department,  administrative region of Grand Est, northeastern France. It is the Pays de Bitche's capital city and the seat of the Canton of Bitche and the communauté de communes du Pays de Bitche.

The town belongs to the Northern Vosges Regional Nature Park and is rated 4-flowers at the towns and villages in bloom competition. The town's population at the 2013 census was 5,225. The inhabitants of the commune are known as Bitchois and Bitchoises.

The town is known for its large citadel originating from a castle built at the beginning of the 13th century. The fortress is noted for its resistance during the Franco-Prussian War. Louis-Casimir Teyssier, its commander and chief, held the place for about eight months with 3,000 men against about 20,000 Prussian and Bavarian soldiers until the French government ordered him to surrender after the ceasefire in 1871. The town became part of Germany after that date until the end of the First World War, when it was given back to France. During the Second World War it was annexed by the Third German Reich (1940–1944).

Geography
Bitche is located near the German border on the small river Horn, at the foot of the northern slope of the Vosges between Haguenau and Sarreguemines.

History
This had long given its name to the countship of Bitsch, which was originally in the possession of the dukes of Lorraine. In 1297 it passed by marriage to Eberhard I of Zweibrücken-Bitsch, whose line became extinct in 1569, when the countship reverted to Lorraine. It passed with that duchy to France in 1766.

After 1766 the town rapidly increased in population. The citadel, which had been constructed by Vauban on the site of the old castle after the capture of Bitche by the French in 1624, had been destroyed when it was restored to Lorraine in 1698. This was restored and strengthened in 1740 into a fortress that proved impregnable up until the 20th century. The attack upon it by the Prussians in 1793 was repulsed.

During the Napoleonic Wars, 1804–14, the citadel at Bitche became a major prisoner of war camp housing British and allied soldiers and sailors. It was also used in this context as a penal camp, housing repeated escapers and recalcitrant prisoners.

In 1815 during Napoleon's Hundred Days, Brigadier-General Creutzer was the commandant. Bitche was besieged by General Zollern's Fourth Infantry Division of the Austrian IV Corps, but Creutzer refused to surrender until the general armistice.

Although Bitche was hotly contested by the Germans after the Battle of Wörth during the Franco-Prussian War in 1870, it held out until the war's end. A large part of the fortification is built into the red sandstone rock, and was rendered bomb-proof; a supply of water was secured to the garrison by a deep well in the interior. Commander of the fortress of Bitche was Louis-Casimir Teyssier. After the war, it was given to the German Empire as part of Alsace-Lorraine. It was given back to France in 1918.

The town is near the Maginot Line, into which the citadel was integrated. Alsace-Lorraine returned to Germany after the French Campaign in the summer of 1940 and remained under German occupation. The training ground at Bitche was utilized by the German Army to form new divisions, for example the 65th Infantry Division formed at Bitche in July 1942. Bitche was liberated in December 1944 by Allied troops but was relinquished in the withdrawal forced by the German counteroffensive. In March 1945 the U.S. 100th Infantry Division broke through the Maginot Line in the Bitche area and liberated the town for good. The attack was a part of Operation Undertone.

After 1945, Bitche became one of the busiest military camps where all parts of the French army manoeuvered. Infantry and cavalry also went to Bitche for experimenting with new weapons during the Cold War. Special training took place against potential bacteriological attacks from the "EAST" side.

Until 1997, military service was compulsory in France. Millions of young soldiers had a few days of training in Bitche.

On March 19, 2021, the official page of Bitche on Facebook was removed without explanation. After the incident was reported by media, Facebook restored the page and apologized to the town.

Population

International relations
Bitche has been twinned with Lebach, Saarland, Germany since 1979.

The town of Bitche was mentioned in BBC comedy panel game QI, in episode 9 of season 3 (or series "C", as the show refers to the series by letters of the alphabet). Bill Bailey commented on the comical nature of seeing a sign "You are now leaving Bitche".

In 2021 the town's Facebook page was removed and reinstated.

Gallery

See also
Communes of the Moselle department

Notes

References

Further reading

 
Communes of Moselle (department)
Vauban fortifications in France
Duchy of Lorraine